Jarosław Bieniuk (born 4 June 1979) is a former Polish football defender. In July 2012, he moved from Widzew Łódź to another Polish Ekstraklasa team, Lechia Gdańsk.

Career

He started playing for Amica Wronki in the 1998/99 season and made his debut on 22 May 1999. In 2006, he transferred to Turkish side Antalyaspor where he played until the end of 2008. In January 2009 he signed a contract with Cypriot club AC Omonia, however, it was terminated a few weeks later and he signed with Widzew Łódź.

On 30 July 2013, he captained his team Lechia Gdańsk in a friendly game against FC Barcelona - and scored a goal in the eventual 2-2 draw against the Spanish giants.

After the 2013–14 season, Bieniuk decided to end his career.

National team

He has also appeared for the Poland national football team, with eight caps to his name.

Goals for senior national team

Family
Bieniuk was in domestic partnership with Anna Przybylska, a Polish actress; they have one daughter Oliwia (born 2002) and two sons: Szymon (born 2006) and Jan (born 2011). They were together until Anna’s death in October 2014. His son Kazimierz was born in March 2020.

References

External links
 

1979 births
Lechia Gdańsk players
Amica Wronki players
Antalyaspor footballers
Widzew Łódź players
Ekstraklasa players
Süper Lig players
Living people
Polish footballers
Poland international footballers
Polish expatriate footballers
Expatriate footballers in Turkey
Sportspeople from Gdańsk
Association football defenders